Joint Enabling Capabilities Command (JECC) is a subordinate command of United States Transportation Command, headquartered at Naval Station Norfolk, Virginia. It was previously part of United States Joint Forces Command. It developed from the Standing Joint Force Headquarters concept trialed during Exercise Millennium Challenge 2002.

It aims to provide mission-tailored, ready joint capability packages to combatant commanders. Its two elements provide capabilities across seven unique functional areas. It aims to bring these packages to a joint force commander within hours of notification.  The JECC subordinate commands are:

 The Joint Planning Support Element (JPSE) – Provides rapidly deployable, tailored, ready, joint planners, operators, logisticians, knowledge managers, and intelligence specialists in order to accelerate the formation and increase the effectiveness of newly formed joint force headquarters.  JPSE also provides ready, rapidly deployable, joint public affairs capabilities to combatant commanders in order to facilitate rapid establishment of joint force headquarters and bridge joint public affairs requirements. JPSE is co-located with the JECC headquarters at Naval Station Norfolk, Virginia.

 The Joint Communications Support Element (Airborne) (JCSE) – Provides rapidly deployable, en route, early entry and scalable command, control, communications, computer, intelligence, surveillance and reconnaissance (C4ISR)  capabilities across the full spectrum of operations in order to facilitate rapid establishment of joint force headquarters and bridge joint C4ISR requirements. JCSE is located at MacDill Air Force Base, Florida.

List of commanders

References

External links
 

Commands of the United States Armed Forces
Military units and formations established in 2008